The half cent was the smallest denomination of United States coin ever minted. It was first minted in 1793 and last minted in 1857. It was minted with five different designs.

History
First authorized by the Coinage Act of 1792 on April 2, 1792, the coin was produced in the United States from 1793 to 1857. The half-cent piece was made of 100% copper and was valued at five milles, or one two-hundredth of a dollar. It was slightly smaller than a modern U.S. quarter with diameters 22 mm (1793), 23.5 mm (1794–1836) and 23 mm (1840–1857). Coinage was discontinued by the Coinage Act of February 21, 1857. They were all produced at the Philadelphia Mint.

Design varieties

There are several different types of half cents:

Liberty Cap, Facing left (designed/engraved by Henry Voigt) – issued 1793
Liberty Cap, Facing right (large head designed by Robert Scot, small head designed by Scot-John Gardner, engraved by Robert Scot) – issued 1794 to 1797
Draped Bust (obverse designed by Gilbert Stuart and Robert Scot, reverse designed by Scot-John Gardner, engraved by Robert Scot) – issued 1800 to 1808
Classic Head (designed/engraved by Robert Scot or John Reich) – issued 1809 to 1836
Braided Hair (designed by Christian Gobrecht) – issued 1840 to 1857

There are no mint marks on any of the coins (all minted at the Philadelphia Mint) and the edges are plain on most half cents. On the 1793, 1794 and some 1795 coins and a variety of the 1797 coin, it was lettered  and another 1797 variety had a gripped, or milled, edge.

Mintage figures

Liberty Cap, facing left
1793 – 35,334

Liberty Cap, facing right
1794 – 81,600
1795 – 139,690
1796 – 1,390
1797 – 127,840

Draped Bust
1800 – 202,908
1802 – 20,266
1803 – 92,000
1804 – 1,055,312
1805 – 814,464
1806 – 356,000
1807 – 476,000
1808 – 400,000

Classic Head (Shown at top right)
1809 – 1,154,572
1810 – 215,000
1811 – 63,140
1825 – 63,000
1826 – 234,000
1828 – 606,000
1829 – 487,000
1831 – 2,200
1832 – 51,000
1833 – 103,000
1834 – 141,000
1835 – 398,000
1836 – proof only, restrikes were made
1837 – No half cents were struck by the United States government; however, due to the need for small change, half-cent tokens were produced by private businessmen.

Braided Hair
1840 through 1849 were proof-only issues.  There were restrikes made.
1849 – 39,864
1850 – 39,812
1851 – 147,672
1852 – proof only.  Restrikes were made.
1853 – 129,694
1854 – 55,358
1855 – 56,500
1856 – 40,430
1857 – 35,180

See also 

 Penny (United States coin), the second smallest denomination of United States coin minted

References

Sources
The Half Cent Die State Book 1793–1857 by Ronald P. Manley, Ph.D., 1998.
American Half Cents – The "Little Half Sisters" (Second Edition) by Roger S. Cohen Jr., 1982.
Walter Breen's Encyclopedia of United States Half Cents 1793–1857 by Walter Breen, 1983.
The Half Cent, 1793–1857 The Story of American's Greatest Little Coin by William R. Eckberg, 2019
The Half Cent Handbook – Draped Bust Varieties 1800–1808 by Ed Fuhrman, 2020.
The Half Cent Handbook – Classic Head & Braided Hair Varieties by Ed Fuhrman, 2021.
The Half Cent Handbook – Liberty Cap Varieties 1793–1797 by Ed Fuhrman, 2022.
The Half Cent Handbook – Errors and Oddities by Ed Fuhrman, 2022.

External links
 Half Cent information by year and type.  Histories, photos, mintages, mints, metal contents, edge designs, designers, and more.
 Half Cent Pictures
 This half cent (numismatics.org:1858.1.1) was the first coin donated to the American Numismatic Society
 Half Cent, Coin Type from United States Photos, mintage, varieties.

1793 introductions
Half-cent coins of the United States
Goddess of Liberty on coins